Ana María Peiró is a Spanish paralympic athlete who competed in Para swimming. She won eight medals at the 1984 Summer Paralympics and 1988 Summer Paralympics.

Career 

At the 1984 Summer Paralympics, she won a gold medal in the 100 meter backstroke L4, 100 meter butterfly L4, and 200 meter medley L4. She won a bronze medal in 100 meter breaststroke L4, and 100 meter freestyle L4.

At the 1988 Summer Paralympics, in Seoul, she won a gold medal, in 100 meter backstroke 5, 100 meter freestyle 5, and 400 meter freestyle 5.

References 

Year of birth missing (living people)
Living people
Paralympic swimmers of Spain
Swimmers from Barcelona
Spanish female freestyle swimmers
Spanish female backstroke swimmers
Spanish female breaststroke swimmers
Spanish female butterfly swimmers
Spanish female medley swimmers
Swimmers at the 1984 Summer Paralympics
Swimmers at the 1988 Summer Paralympics
Medalists at the 1984 Summer Paralympics
Medalists at the 1988 Summer Paralympics
Paralympic gold medalists for Spain
Paralympic bronze medalists for Spain